Dante's Peak is a 1997 American science fiction natural disaster thriller film directed by Roger Donaldson, written by Leslie Bohem, and starring Pierce Brosnan, Linda Hamilton, and Charles Hallahan. The film is set in the fictional town of Dante's Peak where the inhabitants fight to survive a volcanic eruption from a long dormant stratovolcano that has suddenly woken up. The film was released on February 7, 1997, under the production of Universal Pictures and Pacific Western Productions. It received negative reviews from critics and became an average success. It was the last film in which Charles Hallahan starred before his death nine months later in November 1997.

It is the third film collaboration between Gale Anne Hurd and Hamilton, who both previously worked in the first two Terminator films.

Plot

In 1993, USGS volcanologist Harry Dalton and his partner-turned-fiancée Marianne attempt to escape an ongoing eruption in Colombia. As they venture out, a piece of debris smashes through the roof of the truck, killing Marianne.

Four years later, Harry is assigned by his superior Dr. Paul Dreyfus to investigate seismic activity near the town of Dante's Peak, Washington, a town that borders a dormant stratovolcano. Harry arrives and meets Mayor Rachel Wando with her children Graham and Lauren. Rachel offers to take Harry with them as they see her former mother-in-law Ruth Wando, an elderly hermit who lives near the lake at the base of the volcano.

While exploring, they find dead trees, dead squirrels, and two people scalded to death in a hot spring. Harry instructs Paul to bring a USGS team to monitor the volcano, but their initial survey finds no indications of volcanic activity. Paul advises against Harry putting the town on alert. Still, Harry tries to convince Rachel to prepare for a disaster while developing a relationship with her and the children.

One day, Harry and his co-worker Terry examine the summit's crater until a rock slide traps Terry, causing him to suffer a broken leg. Both men are rescued by a helicopter. Days go by showing no signs of any threat or activity. Paul decides that no danger is imminent and the USGS team begins preparing to leave.

When Harry goes to say goodbye to Rachel, they discover that the town's water supply has been contaminated with sulfur dioxide. The next morning, seismic readings and gas levels rise dramatically. Finally convinced that the volcano will erupt and with the National Guard unavailable until the next day, Paul gives Harry permission to put the town on alert.

As a town meeting takes place at the high school, an earthquake strikes and the eruption begins. Harry and Rachel go to retrieve the children only to discover that they have gone to get Ruth, who refused to leave her home. Just as they reach Ruth and the children, a lava flow engulfs Ruth's cabin and destroys the vehicles both parties used to get there. The five flee across the lake in a motorboat, but the lake has become acidic due to sulfur-rich gases emitted from the volcano dissolving in the water to form sulfuric acid, destroying the motor and eating away at the boat. Ruth jumps out of the boat to help it to shore, suffering severe chemical burns and eventually dying. Harry and the Wandos take a Forest Service ranger's truck to continue down the mountain and save Ruth's dog Roughy as they cross a lava flow in their path.

Meanwhile, the National Guard helps the USGS team evacuate. As they leave, a lahar created by the melting ice breaks the upstream dam. While the rest of the team gets across, Paul and his van fails to clear the bridge before it is washed away by the flood, throwing Paul overboard to his death.

Harry and the Wandos arrive at the remains of the town. Harry retrieves a distress radiobeacon from the USGS equipment and learns that the volcano is due for one last eruption. Moments later, the volcano violently rips itself apart in a massive lateral blast, triggering a pyroclastic flow which obliterates everything in its path within seconds. With no way out of town, Harry and the Wandos reach a mine where Graham likes to hang out. The USGS team, watching the eruption from afar, presumes Harry to be dead. Inside the mine, Harry realizes that he left the beacon in the truck. When he goes back for it, aftershocks cause rocks and debris to fall. Harry suffers a broken arm and is trapped in the truck, but is able to activate the beacon.

Days later, Terry notices that the beacon has been activated and the USGS dispatches search and rescue teams. Harry and the Wandos are freed from the mine, reunited with Harry's team, and airlifted out by helicopter.

As the credits roll, the camera pans over the obliterated town and turns to the volcano with its upper half now reduced to a Mount St. Helens-like caldera.

Cast

 Pierce Brosnan as Harry Dalton, a volcanologist for the USGS.
 Linda Hamilton as Rachel Wando, the Mayor of Dante's Peak who also runs a coffeeshop.
 Charles Hallahan as Paul Dreyfus, Harry's superior.
 Grant Heslov as Greg, a member of the USGS.
 Elizabeth Hoffman as Ruth, the former mother-in-law of Rachel.
 Jeremy Foley as Graham Wando, the son of Rachel.
 Jamie Renée Smith as Lauren Wando, the daughter of Rachel and the sister of Graham.
 Arabella Field as Nancy, a member of the USGS.
 Tzi Ma as Stan, a member of the USGS.
 Lee Garlington as Dr. Jane Fox
 Bill Bolender as Sheriff Turner, the sheriff of Dante's Peak.
 Peter Jason as Norman Gates
 Hansford Rowe as Warren Cluster, the manager and proprietor of the motel "Cluster's Last Stand".
 Christopher Murray as a pricey helicopter pilot that the USGS enlist.

Production
Principal photography began on May 6, 1996. The film was shot on location in Wallace, Idaho.

Exterior shots of the Point Dume Post Office in Malibu, California, were used as the USGS's David A. Johnston Cascades Volcano Observatory headquarters in Vancouver, Washington. The facility was named in honor of David A. Johnston, a young scientist who had precisely predicted the volatility of the May 18, 1980, Mount St. Helens eruption and perished during the event.

The scene itself was actually filmed on the tarmac of Van Nuys Airport, while the Mount Adams image was composited in later. Production was completed on August 31, 1996.

Extensive special effects surrounding certain aspects of the film, such as the lava and pyroclastic flows, were created by Digital Domain, Banned from the Ranch Entertainment, and CIS Hollywood. The computer-generated imagery was mostly coordinated and supervised by Patrick McClung, Roy Arbogast, Lori J. Nelson, Richard Stutsman, and Dean Miller. Although the film uses considerable amounts of CGI, the volcanic ash in the film was created using cellulose insulation manufactured by Regal Industries in Crothersville, Indiana. Between visuals, miniatures, and animation, over 300 technicians were directly involved in the production aspects of the special effects.

Locations
 Wallace, Idaho (the fictional town)
 Baker Hot Springs, Mount Baker National Forest, Washington
 Mount St. Helens National Volcanic Monument, Washington (establishing shots)
 Agua Dulce, California
 Point Dume Post Office, Malibu, California (USGS's David A. Johnston Cascades Volcano Observatory headquarters)

Music
The original score was co-composed by John Frizzell and James Newton Howard. Howard wrote the main theme (heard during the opening titles) and a number of cues, while Frizzell wrote the bulk of the score.

Thirty minutes of the score was released by Varèse Sarabande; the short album length being due to high orchestra fees at the time of release. An expanded bootleg exists that contains almost the entire score.

The contents of the CD release can also be found on the region 1 DVD, and Blu-ray on an alternate audio track during the 'Creating a Volcano' documentary.

The "Main Titles" cue is also featured on Varèse's The Towering Inferno and Other Disaster Classics compilation album.

Reception

Box office
The film was released on February 7, 1997 in 2,657 theatres. It debuted at #2 at the box office behind the special edition re-release of Star Wars; it took in $18 million in its opening weekend. After eight weeks in theatres, it had grossed $67.1 million in the United States and $111.0 million overseas, for a total of $178 million worldwide.

Critical reception
Dante's Peak received mostly negative reviews compared to the generally mixed reviews of its rival. Rotten Tomatoes gave the film a 28% rating based on 32 reviews, compared to a 50% rating from 46 reviews for Volcano. The consensus states: "Dante's Peak works when things are on fire, but everything else from dialogue to characters is scathingly bad." However, critic Byron Lafayette of Under The Lens, praised the film for "Showcasing practical effects and doing its best to be a realistic take on what would happen if a Volcano erupted in a small town"

Geologists' reception and educational purpose
The film attracted geologists to create dedicated "information page" to reach out to students interested in science, including the U.S. Geological Survey (USGS) and the University of Maryland. The fact-checking on USGS's information page concluded "in many but not all respects, the movie's depiction of eruptive hazards hits close to the mark". On the other hand, two professors at the Lewis-Clark State College panned the movie for understating the negative effects of a possible false alarm.

The film is also a popular film viewing and discussion in science classes in the United States.

See also
 1980 eruption of Mount St. Helens
 Mount Pinatubo
 Volcano - another volcano-based film released in 1997
 Galeras tragedy
 Survival film

References

External links

 Volcanoes in Historical and Popular Culture "In The Movies" - Dante's Peak at U.S. Geological Survey website.
 
 
 
 
 
 

1997 films
1990s adventure films
1990s disaster films
1997 drama films
American adventure drama films
American disaster films
Films scored by James Newton Howard
Films scored by John Frizzell (composer)
Films about families
Films about volcanoes
Films directed by Roger Donaldson
Films set in 1997
Films set in Washington (state)
Films shot in California
Films shot in Idaho
Universal Pictures films
Films produced by Gale Anne Hurd
1990s English-language films
1990s American films